2061 may refer to:
 The year 2061 in the 2060s decade
 The year 2061 BC in the 21st century BC
 2061: Odyssey Three, a novel by Arthur C. Clarke
 2061: An Exceptional Year, a 2007 Italian film
 2061 Anza, an amor asteroid
 Panha Shabaviz 2061 helicopter

af:2061
bh:२०६१
da:2061
eo:2061
fr:2061
gl:2061
gan:2061年
hr:2061.
mk:2061
ms:2061
nah:2061
new:सन् २०६१
nn:2061
pi:२०६१
sk:2061
tl:2061
tt:2061 ел
tr:2061
tk:2061
war:2061